Oniticellus  is a genus of dung beetles in the subfamily Scarabaeinae of the scarab beetle family.

References

Scarabaeinae